
Gmina Borkowice is a rural gmina (administrative district) in Przysucha County, Masovian Voivodeship, in east-central Poland.

Villages
Gmina Borkowice contains the villages and settlements of Bolęcin, Borkowice, Bryzgów, Kochanów, Ninków, Niska Jabłonica, Politów, Radestów, Rudno, Ruszkowice, Rzuców, Smagów, Wola Kuraszowa, Wymysłów and Zdonków.

Neighbouring gminas
Gmina Borkowice is bordered by the gminas of Chlewiska, Przysucha and Wieniawa.

References
Polish official population figures 2006

Borkowice
Przysucha County